This list of tallest structures in Central Asia ranks skyscrapers, towers and other structures in Central Asia based on official height.

Structures of the Central Asian region consisting of the countries of Kazakhstan, Kyrgyzstan, Tajikistan, Turkmenistan, and Uzbekistan are included in this list.

Completed tallest structures
Only completed structures and buildings that have been topped out are included.

Under construction structures
This list ranks buildings and structures that are under construction in Central Asia and are planned to rise at least 100 metres (330 ft) tall.

Timeline of tallest structures

See also
List of tallest buildings in Kazakhstan
List of tallest buildings in Astana
List of tallest structures in Uzbekistan
List of tallest structures in Turkmenistan
 List of tallest structures in the former Soviet Union
List of tallest buildings in Asia

References 

Tallest
Central Asia
Central Asia